Lu Fang (born 5 May 1972) is a female Chinese sports shooter. She competed in the Women's 10 metre air pistol at the 1996 Summer Olympics, finishing 14th.

References

1972 births
Living people
Chinese female sport shooters
Olympic shooters of China
Shooters at the 1996 Summer Olympics